"93 Million Miles" is a song by American singer-songwriter Jason Mraz. It was released as the second promotional single from his fourth studio album, Love Is a Four Letter Word, on March 27, 2012 via iTunes and in October, 2012, as the second official single. It was written by Mraz, Michael Natter and Mike Daly, and produced by Joe Chiccarelli.

The song title refers to the Earth's geographical location within the Solar System, which is 93 million miles from Sun. Lyrically, the song talks about "no matter where you are in the planet, you can call it home." It received positive reviews, with critics calling it a touching and enjoyable song.

Background 
The song was one of four songs on Love is a Four Letter Word that Mraz wrote with Michael Natter, a guitarist in his 60s who lives up in the mountains of San Diego, and has been playing the same guitar since 1967. Mraz told Artist Direct: "I met him at coffee shop gigs, open mic nights and songwriter nights. He and his wife would play and sing' they are adorable. I invited him to my house to help me change out a toilet, since I figured he would know. He did and brought his guitar over. We change the toilet and he played his guitar. He had all these ideas and riffs that he has been playing for 35 years. He has never had an outlet. I am almost 35, so some of those ideas came into existing same time I was being conceived."

It was based on something Natter would say when the pair were sitting out in the sun, playing guitar. He told Artist Direct: "We'd look at the sun, this fiery nuclear furnace, 93 million miles away, by the time the heat and light gets to us, it's just right." The song was first released as the second promotional single from the album on iTunes, on March 27, 2012.

Composition 
"93 Million Miles" was written by Jason Mraz, Michael Natter and Mike Daly, while production was handled by Joe Chiccarelli. Its title refers to the Earth's geographical location within the Solar System, which is 93 million miles from Sun.
 
Mraz further explained the track, in a "track-by-track" commentary for Billboard:
"93 million miles from the sun is where we live. And 240,000 miles from the moon and that's our geographical location within our solar system. Yet no matter where you are, there you are. And no matter where you are in the planet, you can call that home. I wanted to create a song that acknowledged that home is where the heart is and that's up to you to decide."

Reception
The song received generally favorable reviews. While reviewing the album, Melinda Newman of HitFix wrote that "When Mraz dials back the platitudes just a little bit, something quite enjoyable emerges, such as on '93 Million Miles,' where he reminds the listener that he/she can always come back home. It’s a lilting, lovely tune." Jacob R. Tender of Under the Gun called it "endearing and warmhearted." Mike Ragogna of Huffington Post called it "clever, touching, and philosophical as well as mathematically correct."

The song debuted at number 40 on the Adult Pop Songs chart.

The song was included in a popular Brazilian soap opera, Salve Jorge, which contributed for the success in Brazil.

Music video
The music video for the song was directed by Jeff Coffman and recorded during Mraz's recent appearance at Red Rocks Amphitheatre in Denver, Colorado.

Track listing
Digital download
 "93 Million Miles" – 3:36

Personnel
Acoustic Guitar – Jason Mraz, Mike Daly
Bass – Justin Meldal Johnson
Drums, Percussion – Matt Chamberlin
Guitar – Tim Pierce
Keyboards – Jeff Babko
Vocals – Jason Mraz
Written – Jason Mraz, Michael Natter, Mike Daly
Produced - Joe Chiccarelli

Charts

References

2012 singles
Jason Mraz songs
2010s ballads
Pop ballads
Songs written by Jason Mraz
2011 songs
Atlantic Records singles
Songs written by Mike Daly